Sir Patrick Alexander Macnaghten, 11th Baronet, DL (24 January 1927 – 22 August 2007) was a British baronet and Chief of the Clan Macnaghten.

Sir Patrick was educated at Eton College and Trinity College, Cambridge and worked as an engineer and manager with Cadbury's Chocolate.  He succeeded to the Baronetcy and as Chief of the Name and Arms of the Clan Macnaghten in 1972. In his retirement he lived at the estate of his ancestral home Dundarave which he ran until 2005.  He was a Deputy Lieutenant and Vice President of the Northern Ireland Ploughing Association.

Sir Patrick was a member of the Fisheries Conservancy Board.

He married Marianne Schaefer, Lady Macnaghten, on 10 September 1955 and had three children:

 Sir Malcolm Macnaghten, Bt (b. 21 September 1956), currently the 12th baronet.
 Edward Alexander (b. 24 July 1958)
 David Charles (b. 22 September 1962)

Sir Patrick died on 22 August 2007. The funeral was on Tuesday 28 August, in Dunluce Parish Church. Lady Macnaghten died in 2020.

References

External links
 Obituary
 Ulster-Scots clan chief is laid to rest, David Young, Belfast Newsletter, September 2007

1927 births
2007 deaths
Baronets in the Baronetage of the United Kingdom
People educated at Eton College
Deputy Lieutenants
Alumni of Trinity College, Cambridge